Cadarian Raines (born October 12, 1990) is an American professional basketball player for KB Trepça of the Kosovo Basketball Superleague. Standing at 2.06 m (6'9"), he plays the power forward and the center positions. After playing four years of college basketball at Virginia Tech, Raines entered the 2014 NBA draft, but he was not selected in the draft's two rounds.

High school career
Raines played high school basketball at Petersburg, where he was coached by Bill Lawson. Raines led the Crimson Wave to a 30-1 record and a 14-0 in district action. As a senior, he averaged 15.6 points, 9.8 rebounds, 3.8 blocks and 1.6 assists per game. He also earned First-team All-State and first team All-Metro as a senior and was the MVP of the Fort Lee Tournament

Professional career
After going undrafted in the 2014 NBA draft, Raines joined Villa Angela of the Argentine second division. He left the club until December 31, 2014, after averaging 8.8 points and 6.5 rebounds per game. He then joined Mono Vampire at Thailand. With Mono Vampire, he won the Thailand League.

The following season, Raines joined Al-Arabi of the Qatari Basketball League. Due to his poor performances, he was released from the Qatari team on November. On February 23, 2016, he signed with IRT Tanger of the Moroccan League until the end of the season.

On November 12, 2016, Raines signed with Apollon Limassol of the Cypriot League. With Apollon, Raines played at the Cypriot League All-Star Games of both 2017 and 2018. 

On January 24, 2017, Raines signed with Apollon Patras of the Greek Basket League, replacing Michael Cobbins on the team's squad. On April 14, 2017, Raines signed with the Lebanese team Club Sagesse.

Raines has since played for USK Praha of the NBL among other teams.

References

External links
 RealGM profile
 EuroBasket profile
 Sports-Reference profile

1990 births
Living people
American expatriate basketball people in Argentina
American expatriate basketball people in Australia
American expatriate basketball people in Cyprus
American expatriate basketball people in the Czech Republic
American expatriate basketball people in Greece
American expatriate basketball people in Lebanon
American expatriate basketball people in Morocco
American expatriate basketball people in Qatar
American expatriate basketball people in Thailand
American men's basketball players
Apollon Limassol BC players
Apollon Patras B.C. players
Basketball players from Virginia
Centers (basketball)
Greek Basket League players
Power forwards (basketball)
Sportspeople from Petersburg, Virginia
USK Praha players
Virginia Tech Hokies men's basketball players